Swanwick is an unincorporated community in Perry County, Illinois, United States. Swanwick once had a post office, which closed on October 15, 1988.

References

Unincorporated communities in Perry County, Illinois
Unincorporated communities in Illinois